Derek William Soakell (born 7 December 1939) is a former English cricketer.  Soakell was a right-handed batsman who bowled right-arm medium pace in the late 1960s and early 1970s.  He was born in Haswell, County Durham.

Soakell made his debut for Durham against the Warwickshire Second XI in the 1966 Minor Counties Championship.  He played Minor counties cricket for Durham from 1966 to 1968, making 4 Minor Counties Championship appearances, before joining Northumberland in 1970.  He played Minor counties cricket for Northumberland from 1970 to 1972, making 14 Minor Counties Championship appearances for Northumberland.  He rejoined Durham in 1973, making 4 appearances that season in the Minor Counties Championship.  1973 saw him make his List A debut against Yorkshire in the Gillette Cup.  In this match, he scored 10 unbeaten runs to guide Durham to a famous 5 wicket win.  He made a further List A appearance against Essex in the following round of the same competition.  He was dismissed for 36 runs in this match by Keith Pont, with Essex winning by 7 wickets.

References

External links
Derek Soakell at ESPNcricinfo
Derek Soakell at CricketArchive

1939 births
Living people
People from Haswell, County Durham
Cricketers from County Durham
English cricketers
Durham cricketers
Northumberland cricketers